Cedar Gap is an unincorporated community in southwestern Wright County, Missouri, United States. Cedar Gap lies just south of US Route 60 between Mansfield to the east and Seymour in adjacent Webster County to the west.

History and geography

The early railroad also constructed a dam to form the 40 acre Cedar Gap Lake one mile to the northwest on the Wright–Webster county line as a water supply for the steam engined trains.

Cedar Gap lies on the drainage divide between the Gasconade River to the north, Bryant Creek which is a tributary to the North Fork River to the southeast and the Finley Creek tributary to the James River to the west.

The Cedar Gap Conservation Area includes  of rugged topography including the headwaters of Bryant Creek lying south of Cedar Gap. The conservation area was formed in 1999 and is managed by the Missouri Department of Conservation.

References

Unincorporated communities in Missouri
Wright County, Missouri